Places in Between is an album by Terri Hendrix.

Band Information
 Terri Hendrix — vocals, harmonica, acoustic guitar, papoose, mandolin, mouth harp
 Lloyd Maines — acoustic, electric, steel and baritone guitar, papoose, mandolin, dobro, tambourine, vocals
 Glenn Fukunaga — bass
 Paul Pearcy — drums, percussion
 Bukka Allen — accordion, keyboards
 Riley Osbourn — keyboards
 Richard Bowden — cello, violin
 Danny Barnes — banjo
 John Mills — horns
 George Morgan — penny whistle

Producer: Lloyd Maines

Track listing
 Prelude
 Goodtime Van
 It's A Given
 Places In Between
 Wish
 Eagles
 Intro
 Joy or Sorrow
 My Own Place
 Throw My Love
 Invisible Girl
 Motherless Children
 Fair
 Reprise
 Moon on the Water

References

2000 albums
Terri Hendrix albums